"Salvatore" is a song recorded by American recording artist Lana Del Rey for her album Honeymoon (2015). It was written by Del Rey and Rick Nowels. The song premiered on Huw Stephens' BBC Radio 1 program on September 16, 2015. The song has been described as "old world-inspired", as well as "an Italian serenade".

Background and release
Del Rey spoke to Huw Stephens on BBC Radio 1 about the song, saying: "It's probably the track that's the most different from the other tracks on the record. It has a little bit of an old-world Italian feel. It's kind of a weirder song but I love the chorus. It's filmic."

On September 16, 2015, The song premiered live to BBC Radio 1 by Del Rey from Paris, France. The official audio for the song was supposed to be uploaded to Del Rey's Vevo channel on the same day, but it didn't materialize. "Salvatore" was made available when the album Honeymoon was released on September 18, 2015.

Critical reception
The song received critical acclaim from Radio.com, who praised Del Rey's vocal performance and said, "'Salvatore' has a wending, almost woozy, style to it. It's a slower track compared to many of the others she's already released off the album, but it keeps with the album's overall dark almost macabre–march towards some fateful end."

British singer Adele also gave the song "Salvatore" a praise in Vogue magazine, commenting "The chorus of this song makes me feel like i'm flying...".

Credits and personnel
Credits adapted from the Honeymoon liner notes.

 Lana Del Rey – vocals, songwriting, production
 Rick Nowels – songwriting, production, pads, mellotron, strings, acoustic guitar, electric guitar, piano, bass, percussion
 Kieron Menzies – production, engineering, recording, mixing, percussion
 Patrick Warren – orchestrations
 Trevor Yasuda – engineering, additional recording
 Chris Garcia – engineering, additional recording
 Adam Ayan – mastering
 Phil Joly – assistant engineering
 Iris Sofia – assistant engineering
 Brian Griffin – live drums, percussion.

"Salvatore" was recorded at Electric Lady Studios in New York City, mixed at The Green Building in Santa Monica, California, and mastered at Gateway Mastering in Portland, Maine.

References

2015 songs
Lana Del Rey songs
Song recordings produced by Rick Nowels
Songs written by Lana Del Rey
Songs written by Rick Nowels